Thomas Henry White (12 November 1881 – after 1909) was an English footballer who played as an outside right for Stockport County in the Football League. He also played for Chesham Generals, Grays United, Brighton & Hove Albion, Carlisle United, Exeter City and Watford. At Watford and Chesham, White played alongside his younger brother, Charlie.

References

1881 births
People from Tring
English footballers
Association football outside forwards
Chesham United F.C. players
Grays Athletic F.C. players
Brighton & Hove Albion F.C. players
Stockport County F.C. players
Carlisle United F.C. players
Exeter City F.C. players
Watford F.C. players
Southern Football League players
English Football League players
Year of death missing